Basiran may refer to:
 Basiran, Fars
 Basiran, Sistan and Baluchestan
 Basiran, South Khorasan